Chicken tabaka ( tsitsila tabaka) or chicken tapaka ( tsitsila tapaka) is a traditional Georgian dish of a pan-fried chicken which is also popular in other Caucasian cuisines. It also became a common restaurant dish in the Soviet cuisine and is found nowadays in many restaurants throughout Eastern Europe and Central Asia.

The chicken is fried in a traditional frying pan called tapa. For frying thoroughly, the chicken is flattened out on the pan and pressed by a weight. In modern cookery, special pan sets with a heavy cover or with a screw press are often used.

Chicken tabaka is often seasoned with garlic or dressed with traditional Georgian sauces, such as bazhe, satsivi or tkemali.

See also
 List of chicken dishes
Chicken as food

References

Georgian words and phrases
Cuisine of Georgia (country)
Chicken dishes